Andy's Summer Playhouse is a youth theater located in Wilton, New Hampshire.

Andy's Summer Playhouse programs foster creative collaborations between children and professional artists who work in a variety of media: performance art, theater, dance, music, puppetry, video, set and lighting design and playwriting. In addition to its unique mission to produce original and adapted plays for children, the theater boasts a number of well-known alumni and teaching artists, including Tony Award winning artists Stephen Karam and Lisa Kron, Emmy Award winning artists Paul Jacobs and Sarah Durkee, Pulitzer Prize winning playwright David Lindsay-Abaire, Caldecott Medal winning authors Brian Selznick and Elizabeth Orton Jones, as well as several Alpert, Bessie,  Obie, and Drama Desk Award winning artists.

History
Named after children's book illustrator C. W. Anderson, Andy's was founded in 1971 by two teachers at the Mascenic Regional School, Margaret Sawyer and William Williams. The Playhouse found its first home in Mason, New Hampshire, and was later relocated to a historic meeting house in Wilton.  From 1980 to 1993, the playhouse grew under the artistic direction of Dan Hurlin, who attracted a number of internationally recognized artists from PS 122, The Kitchen, 8BC, WOW Cafe and other avant-garde theatre venues in New York City. From 1994 to 2007, the theater was led by director and playwright Robert Lawson, and DJ Potter served as Artistic Director from 2008 to 2014. Both artists further solidified the organization's professional reputation, and increasingly involved alumni in the artistic and executive operations of the theatre. The theatre is currently led by Jared Mezzocchi.

The Building
Andy's sits on the site of the original meeting house of Wilton, a log structure built in 1752 but then torn down and replaced with a larger meeting house in 1779. The second meeting house served the town for 80 years until it burned down in 1859. The town voted to build a third meeting house (the building that stands today) on the same spot, at a cost "not to exceed $2,500" and the building was completed in 1860. The original Paul Revere and Sons bell damaged in the fire was recast by Henry Northey Hooper & Sons of Boston and placed in the new building, where it remains today in the bell tower. In 1883, the town moved its business to a new Town Hall located several miles to the east in what is now downtown Wilton, so the current building was sold in 1884 to a group of interested citizens and renamed Citizens Hall. It served for many years as a public meeting hall, and was taken over by the National Grange organization in 1925, and then by Wilton Lions Club in 1968. The Pine Hill Waldorf School bought the building in 1978 and for several years ran a school on the site. It was sold to Andy's Summer Playhouse on August 11, 1985.

Notable alumni and teaching artists

 Henry Akona, director and composer
 Jess Barbagallo, playwright and performer
 Sally Bomer, choreographer
 Patrick Boutwell, musician
 David Bowles, director
 Rosellen Brown, author
 Matthew Buckingham, filmmaker and multimedia artist
 Lenora Champagne, playwright and performing artist
 Emmanuelle Chaulet, actress
 Austin Chick, film director, screenwriter and producer
 Catherine Coray, director, actor and teacher
 Migdalia Cruz, playwright
 Dancenoise, performance artists
 Kyle deCamp, multimedia performance artist
 David Dorfman, choreographer and teacher
 Sarah Durkee, singer-songwriter, lyricist, and writer 
 Edward Einhorn, playwright, director and novelist
 Daniel Mark Epstein, poet, dramatist and biographer
 Dan Froot, performance artist and musician
 Rosanna Gamson, choreographer and director
 Janie Geiser, artist and experimental filmmaker
 Alex Gino, children's book author
 Jonathan Glatzer, writer, director and producer
 James Godwin, actor
 Mimi Goese, musician
 Ain Gordon, playwright, director and actor
 Neil Greenberg, choreographer
 David Greenspan, actor and playwright
 Rinne Groff, playwright and performer
 Sharon Hayes, multimedia artist
 Cynthia Hopkins, performance artist, composer and musician
 Holly Hughes, performance artist
 Sam Huntington, actor
 Dan Hurlin, puppeteer and performance artist
 Anne Iobst, performance artist
 Paul Jacobs, composer and musician
 Amy Jenkins, artist and experimental filmmaker
 Elizabeth Orton Jones, illustrator and children's book author
 Myles Kane, film producer and wizard rock artist
 Stephen Karam, playwright and screenwriter
 John Kelly, performance artist
 Andy Kirshner, composer, performer, writer and media artist
 Lisa Kron, actress and playwright
 Robert Lawson, writer, director, composer and visual artist
 David Leslie, performance artist and stuntman
 Elizabeth Levy, children's book author
 Chris Lindsay-Abaire, actress
 David Lindsay-Abaire, playwright, lyricist and screenwriter
 Sondra Loring, dancer, choreographer and actor
 Erika Kate MacDonald, performing artist and playwright
 Linda Mancini, actor, writer and performance artist
 Victoria Marks, choreographer and teacher
 Jared Mezzocchi, multimedia theatre director and designer
 Sarah McLellan, executive director
 Tom Murrin, performance artist and playwright
 Eileen Myles, poet and writer
 Jim Neu, playwright
 Qui Nguyen, playwright and fight director
 Brooke O'Harra, writer, director and performer
 Julia Older, poet and translator
 Pat Oleszko, performance artist
 Claire Porter, choreographer and comedian
 Dave Quay, actor
 Alice Reagan, director
 Jenny Romaine, puppeteer, performer and director
 John C. Russell, playwright
 Dan Moses Schreier, composer and sound designer
 Brian Selznick, children's book author and illustrator
 Lucy Sexton, performance artist and producer
 Louise Smith, playwright and actress
 Kate Snodgrass, director and playwright
 Henry Stram, actor
 Carmelita Tropicana, performance artist
 Fritz Van Orden, musician
 Meiyin Wang, director
 Washboard Jungle, musicians
 Erik White, musician
 Kristine Woods, visual artist

References 

Theatres in New Hampshire
Youth theatre companies
Theatre companies in New Hampshire
Wilton, New Hampshire
Education in Hillsborough County, New Hampshire
Tourist attractions in Hillsborough County, New Hampshire